The Seattle Seahawks are a professional American football team based in Seattle, Washington. They are members of the Western Division of the National Football Conference (NFC) in the National Football League (NFL). The team, along with the Tampa Bay Buccaneers, joined the NFL in 1976 as expansion teams. The Seahawks are the only team to have played in both the American Football Conference (AFC) and NFC Championship Games. The team has made three Super Bowl appearances; they lost to the Pittsburgh Steelers in Super Bowl XL, before winning Super Bowl XLVIII against the Denver Broncos. The Seahawks then lost Super Bowl XLIX to the New England Patriots.

There have been eight coaches for the Seahawks franchise. The team's current coach, Pete Carroll, joined the team in 2010, and holds the team record for most regular season wins (119). Tom Flores, who coached the team from 1991 to 1994, was the team's least successful coach with a winning percentage of .292. Mike McCormack and Tom Flores are the only Seahawks coaches to have been inducted into the Pro Football Hall of Fame.

Key

Coaches
Note: Statistics are accurate through the end of the 2022 NFL season.

Notes

References

 
Seattle Seahawks
head coaches